George Leslie may refer to:
 George Leonidas Leslie (1840–1878), American bank robber
 George Leslie, 1st Earl of Rothes (died 1490), Scottish nobleman and diplomat
 George Leslie, 2nd Earl of Rothes (died 1513), Scottish nobleman
 George Leslie, 4th Earl of Rothes (died 1558), Scottish nobleman and diplomat
 George Leslie, 15th Earl of Rothes (1809–1841), Scottish nobleman
 George Leslie (footballer) (1907–1986), English footballer
 George Leslie (politician) (born 1936), former Senior Vice Chairman of the Scottish National Party
 George Farquhar Leslie (1820–1860), New South Wales politician
 George Cunningham Leslie (1920–1988), Royal Naval officer
 George Dunlop Leslie (1835–1921), English genre painter, author and illustrator
 George Leslie (Upper Canada), (1804-1893) early settler of York, Upper Canada

Partial name match 
 George Leslie Mackay (1844–1901), first Presbyterian missionary to northern Formosa (Taiwan)
 George Leslie Drewry (1894–1918), English recipient of the Victoria Cross
 George Leslie Adkin (1888–1964), New Zealand farmer, geologist, archaeologist, ethnologist, photographer, tramper and environmentalist
 George Leslie Cochran (1889–1960), baseball player